Kamala Krishnaswamy is an Indian scientist in nutrition. She is the former director of the National institute of Nutrition. She was also president of the Nutrition Society of India.

Biography
She earned her MBBS and MD in Internal Medicine from Osmania University. She did training in clinical pharmacology in the Karolinska institute in Sweden under a World Health Organization fellowship. She joined the National institute of Nutrition in 1964 and became its director in 1997.

Books 

 Obesity in the urban middle class in Delhi.
 Drug Metabolism and Pharmacokinetics in Malnutrition.

References

Living people
Indian nutritionists
20th-century Indian women scientists
20th-century Indian biologists
Year of birth missing (living people)
Osmania University alumni